The Umbrella Academy is an American superhero television series based on the comic book series of the same name written by Gerard Way, illustrated by Gabriel Bá, and published by Dark Horse Comics. Created for Netflix by Steve Blackman and developed by Jeremy Slater, it revolves around a dysfunctional family of adopted sibling superheroes who reunite to solve the mystery of their father's death and the threat of an imminent apocalypse. The series is produced by Borderline Entertainment (season 1–2), Irish Cowboy (season 3), Dark Horse Entertainment, and Universal Content Productions. Netflix gave seasons 1 and 2 a TV-14 rating, while season 3 received a TV-MA rating.

The cast features Elliot Page, Tom Hopper, David Castañeda, Emmy Raver-Lampman, Robert Sheehan, Aidan Gallagher, Cameron Britton, Mary J. Blige, John Magaro, Adam Godley, Colm Feore, Justin H. Min, Ritu Arya, Yusuf Gatewood, Marin Ireland, Kate Walsh, Genesis Rodriguez, and Britne Oldford. The adaptation began development as a film optioned by Universal Pictures in 2011. It was eventually shelved in favor of a television series in 2015, before being officially greenlit by Netflix in July 2017. The series is filmed in Toronto and Hamilton, both of which are located in Ontario.

The first season was released on Netflix on February 15, 2019. In April 2019, Netflix reported that 45 million households had watched season one during its first month of release, thus becoming one of the most-streamed series of the year. That same month, following the success of the first season, the series was renewed for a second season, which was released on July 31, 2020. In November 2020, the series was renewed for a third season, which was released on June 22, 2022. In August 2022, the series was renewed for a fourth and final season.

All three seasons received positive reviews from critics, and the series has received a number of accolades, including six Emmy nominations.

Premise
The Umbrella Academy is set in a universe where 43 women around the world give birth simultaneously at noon on October 1, 1989, although none had shown any sign of pregnancy until labor began. Seven of the children are adopted by eccentric billionaire Sir Reginald Hargreeves and turned into a superhero team that he calls "The Umbrella Academy." Hargreeves gives the children numbers rather than names, but their robot-mother, Grace, later names six of them: Luther, Diego, Allison, Klaus, Ben, and Vanya. Reginald puts six of the children to work fighting crime but keeps Vanya apart from her siblings' activities, claiming she demonstrates no powers of her own.

The first season is set in the present day, where Luther is part ape and has lived on the Moon for four years, Allison is a famous actress, Vanya is a violinist, Klaus has a drug addiction, Five disappeared sixteen years earlier, Ben, now deceased, is a ghost able to converse only with Klaus, and Diego has become a vigilante. The estranged siblings learn that Reginald has died and gather for his funeral. Five returns from the future, revealing that a global apocalypse is imminent, but is chased by time-travelling Commission operatives Hazel and Cha-Cha. The reunited siblings try to uncover the secrets behind Reginald Hargreeves' life and their dysfunctional relationships are strained. They band together to try to prevent the impending apocalypse.

The second season sees the siblings scattered in Dallas at different times in the early 1960s (as a result of the events of the first season), establishing lives for themselves. Five arrives there on November 25, 1963, minutes before a nuclear doomsday that is linked to JFK not being assassinated, but with the help of Hazel manages to travel back ten days. Five is hunted by a trio of Swedish assassins but finds his siblings, who have all made new lives, and attempts to reunite them in order to stop this new apocalypse.

In the third season the siblings realize their actions in the past created a new timeline and returning to 2019 is vastly different where they have been replaced by another Hargreeves superhero group adopted by Reginald, dubbed "The Sparrow Academy". They also have to find a way to stop a kugelblitz from consuming and destroying the universe created as a result of the grandfather paradox the siblings caused through their time-travel.

Cast and characters

Main

 Elliot Page as Viktor/Vanya Hargreeves / The White Violin / Umbrella Number Seven, a meek violinist, alienated from his siblings as he has no apparent supernatural abilities, who writes a damning tell-all book about his childhood. In reality, he can convert sound waves into physical force, an ability his father suppressed with drugs as he considered it too powerful and dangerous to control. The character is known as Vanya and referred to as female until he comes out as a transgender man in the third season, going then by Viktor and using he/him pronouns after the change. This change corresponds with Page's own transition in real life. T.J. McGibbon and Alyssa Gervasi portray the character as a teenager and a 4-year-old, respectively.
 Tom Hopper as Luther Hargreeves / Spaceboy / Umbrella Number One, an astronaut with super strength who lived on the Moon for four years on a mission from his father. He was severely injured during a mission and is the only sibling who did not leave the team. To save his life, Reginald injected him with a serum derived from a gorilla that turned his upper body into that of a non-human gorilla. In seasons 1 and 2, he secretly harbors romantic feelings for Allison, which fade in season 3 when he falls in love with Sloane. Cameron Brodeur portrays a younger Luther.
 David Castañeda as Diego Hargreeves / The Kraken / Umbrella Number Two, a rebellious troublemaker with a mild telekinetic ability to curve the trajectory of moving objects, including knives and bullets. His jealousy of Luther for his father's affections led to him becoming a vigilante after leaving the Umbrella Academy. He starts a relationship with Lila in season 2 and has conceived a child with her by season 3. Blake Talabis portrays a younger Diego.
 Emmy Raver-Lampman as Allison Hargreeves / The Rumor / Umbrella Number Three, a celebrity actress and mother with the ability to control minds and bend reality with the phrase "I heard a rumor...". In season 3 she discovers she can now control minds without needing the phrase in moments of intense anger. Prior to her first marriage before season 1 she was romantically interested in Luther and it is hinted that these feelings are continued in season 1. In season 2 she marries Raymond Chestnut. Eden Cupid and Jordana Blake portray Allison as a teenager and a 4-year-old, respectively.
 Robert Sheehan as Klaus Hargreeves / The Séance / Umbrella Number Four, a flamboyant drug and alcohol addict possessing the ability to communicate with the dead and temporarily make them corporeal - he uses this ability to connect with Ben. In season 3, he discovers he also has the power of immortality and can thus revive himself and heal his own wounds after being killed, and even recreate his body if it is obliterated. Dante Albidone portrays a younger Klaus.
 Aidan Gallagher as Five Hargreeves / The Boy / Umbrella Number Five, a boy with the ability to jump through space and time. After traveling to the future he ended up in a post-apocalyptic world, unable to get back. He survived on his own for decades before being recruited into The Commission, a secretive agency that keeps track of the established timeline of the world, finding and eliminating those who would threaten it. He eventually betrayed them in order to get back to his time (2019) to warn his family of the impending apocalypse. Returning to his time in the pilot episode causes him to revert to his 13-year-old body, played by Gallagher. Jim Watson plays an adult Five and Sean Sullivan portrays an elderly Five.
 Mary J. Blige as Cha-Cha (season 1), a Commission agent partnered with Hazel, she is "[a]ll-business" and the more sociopathic and ruthless of the two assassins who puts work above all else.
 Cameron Britton as Hazel (season 1; guest season 2), Cha-Cha's partner, a fellow assassin who is disillusioned with his life as an agent and plans to leave the Commission after falling in love with doughnut store-owner, Agnes. In season 2, an elderly Hazel appears to Five in 1963 to help him prevent doomsday.
 John Magaro as Leonard Peabody / Harold Jenkins (season 1), Vanya's love interest in season 1. As a child, he was an admirer of the Umbrella Academy and begged to join, since he was born on the same day but was the result of a normal pregnancy, and in his childhood was publicly humiliated and rejected by Reginald. He later discovers Reginald's diary, detailing Vanya's potential, and inserts himself into her life with the goal of manipulating her into discovering and using his powers. However, Vanya kills him after discovering his ruse. Jesse Noah Gruman portrays a younger Harold.
 Adam Godley as Phinneus Pogo, an intelligent chimpanzee who is Reginald's close assistant. Godley provides the voice and facial performance capture, while Ken Hall serves as body-double for the motion capture to play the character on set. In season 2, a younger version of Pogo appears in 1963, who is treated like a son by Reginald and Grace. 
 Godley also portrays Pogo in the season 3 alternative timeline, where he left the Sparrow Academy because he grew disillusioned with Reginald, and became a tattoo artist.
 Colm Feore as Sir Reginald Hargreeves / The Monocle, the Umbrella Academy's adoptive father and a billionaire industrialist who died in 2019 by suicide, leading to the planned reunion of his children. In the alternate timeline, he is revealed to still be alive, having founded the Sparrow Academy after disliking the Umbrella Academy in 1963 and deciding to adopt different children instead.
 Justin H. Min as Ben Hargreeves / The Horror / Umbrella Number Six (season 2; recurring season 1), who can summon tentacled horrors from his body. Ben is deceased, but appears regularly to Klaus and helps him occasionally. Ethan Hwang portrays a younger Ben.
Min also portrays Ben Hargreeves / Sparrow Number Two (season 2–present), an alternate version of Ben who, like his Umbrella counterpart, was adopted by Reginald alongside five other children. This Ben is still alive in 2019 as a member of the Sparrow Academy, with no memory of the Umbrella Academy.
 Ritu Arya as Lila Pitts (season 2–present), Diego's love interest and The Handler's adopted daughter who is revealed to be one of the super-powered children born on the same day. Her powers allow her to mirror someone else's. In season 3, she is pregnant with her and Diego's child. Raya Korah and Anjana Vernuganan portray Lila as a teenager and a 4-year-old, respectively.
 Yusuf Gatewood as Raymond Chestnut (season 2; recurring season 3), Allison's second husband and a civil rights activist in 1963. At the end of season 3, he becomes the father of Allison's daughter in the reset universe.
 Marin Ireland as Sissy Cooper (season 2; guest season 3), Vanya's love interest who takes her in when Vanya  arrives in the 1960s and is hit by her car. She is also Harlan's mother and trapped in an abusive marriage with Carl.
 Kate Walsh as The Handler (season 2; recurring season 1; special guest season 3), the head of the Commission and Five's former boss. The Handler is also Lila's adopted mother, as she used the Commission to kill her parents and claim Lila for herself to use her powers. Walsh makes a speaking-only cameo in season 3 episode 7 in form of a letter to Lila. 
 Genesis Rodriguez as Sloane Hargreeves / Sparrow Number Five (season 3), a member of the Sparrow Academy with the ability to manipulate gravity, who falls in love with Luther and later marries him.
 Britne Oldford as Fei Hargreeves / Sparrow Number Three (season 3), a member of the Sparrow Academy with the ability to control crows. She is blind and uses the crows as her eyes to spy on others.

Recurring

 Sheila McCarthy as Agnes Rofa (season 1), Hazel's love interest. She is the owner, waitress, and baker at Griddy's Doughnuts. Agnes died from cancer before the events of season 2 after 20 years with Hazel.
 Jordan Claire Robbins as Grace Hargreeves / Mom, a robot who acted as the mother of the Umbrella Academy children and has an especially close bond with Diego. She was built by Reginald after Vanya used her power to attack several nannies. A human version of Grace was Reginald's girlfriend in 1963.
 Robbins also portrays Grace in the alternate timeline, where she serves as a maid to the Sparrow Academy, but she gets corrupted by the Kugelblitz and sees it as a god.
 Ashley Madekwe as Detective Eudora Patch (season 1), Diego's former romantic partner who is killed by Cha-Cha
 Peter Outerbridge as The Conductor (season 1), the leader of the orchestra for which Vanya plays
 Rainbow Sun Francks as Detective Chuck Beaman (season 1), Eudora's colleague
 Matt Biedel as Sgt. Dale Chedder (season 1), Eudora's colleague
 Cody Ray Thompson (season 1) and Calem MacDonald (season 2) as Dave Katz, Klaus' lover during the Vietnam War whom he meets in season 1 when time-traveling, and later visits his younger self in 1963 prior to their meeting
 Patrice Goodman as Dot (season 2; guest seasons 1 and 3), a case manager for the Commission
 Ken Hall as Herb (season 2; guest seasons 1 and 3), an analytics specialist for the Commission
 Kevin Rankin as Elliott (season 2), a conspiracy theorist who encounters and aids the Hargreeves in 1963
 Kris Holden-Ried as Axel (season 2), the leader of a trio of Swedish triplet assassins working for the Commission
 John Kapelos as Jack Ruby (season 2), a famous gangster in Dallas who employs Luther as his bodyguard
 Stephen Bogaert as Carl Cooper (season 2), Sissy's abusive husband and Harlan's neglectful father
 Raven Dauda as Odessa (season 2), owner of a Black beauty salon in South Dallas who takes Allison in when she arrives in 1961
 Dewshane Williams as Miles (season 2), Raymond's friend and fellow civil rights activist
 Jason Bryden as Otto (season 2), one of the triplet assassins
 Tom Sinclair as Oscar (season 2), one of the triplet assassins
 Justin Paul Kelly (season 2; guest season 3) and Callum Keith Rennie (season 3) as Harlan Cooper / Lester Pocket, Sissy and Carl's eight-year-old son, who is nonverbal and has an unspecified disability. He is neglected by his father and finds a surrogate second parent in Vanya. After Vanya saves him from drowning, he receives his own powers. In season 3, Harlan has aged into an elderly man who has learned to speak but still struggles to control his unwanted powers.
 Dov Tiefenbach as Keechie (season 2), a devoted member of Klaus' cult in 1963
 Robin Atkin Downes as A.J. Carmichael (season 2), a talking goldfish who is the leader of the Commission board until Five kills him in order to obtain passage back to 2019 
 Mouna Traoré as Jill (season 2), a member of Klaus' cult with whom Ben falls in love in the 1960s
 Justin Cornwell as Marcus Hargreeves / Sparrow Number One (season 3), a member and leader of the Sparrow Academy with superhuman strength who is killed by the Kugelblitz
 Jake Epstein as Alphonso Hargreeves / Sparrow Number Four (season 3), a physically scarred and injured member of the Sparrow Academy with the ability to reflect any physical harm back to his opponents. He is killed by Harlan after trying to murder the Umbrella Academy.
 Cazzie David as Jayme Hargreeves / Sparrow Number Six (season 3), a member of the Sparrow Academy with the ability to spit hallucinogenic venom. She is killed by Harlan after trying to murder the Umbrella Academy.
 Javon "Wanna" Walton as Stanley "Stan" (season 3), a twelve-year-old boy posing as Diego and Lila's son at Lila's request, who is later killed by the Kugelblitz
 Julian Richings as Chet Rodo (season 3), the eccentric manager of the Hotel Obsidian

Episodes

Season 1 (2019)

Season 2 (2020)

Season 3 (2022)

Season 4

Production

Development
A film version of the comic book series The Umbrella Academy was optioned by Universal Studios. Originally, screenwriter Mark Bomback was hired to write the screenplay; Rawson Marshall Thurber reportedly replaced him in 2010. There had been little talk of the film from that time. In an interview with Newsarama at the 2012 New York Comic Con, Way mentioned that there have been "good talks" and a "really good script", but that it was "kind of up to the universe".

On July 7, 2015, it was announced that The Umbrella Academy would be developed into a television series produced by Universal Cable Productions, rather than an original film. On July 11, 2017, it was officially announced that Netflix had greenlit a live-action series adaptation of The Umbrella Academy with Way and Bá acting as executive producers, to premier in 2019. Jeremy Slater wrote the script for the pilot episode, and Steve Blackman serves as showrunner. The first season of The Umbrella Academy was released on Netflix on February 15, 2019.

On April 2, 2019, the series was renewed for a second season, which was released on July 31, 2020. It was also confirmed that the second season would consist of ten episodes, like the first season. The season release date remained unknown until May 18, 2020, when a teaser trailer concept was released where the main cast danced to "I Think We're Alone Now" by Tiffany. Steve Blackman confirmed to The Hollywood Reporter that he wanted to stay close to the content of the comics. On June 26 it was revealed that the series would be taking place at the 1960s in Dallas, due to the time travel from the end of the previous season.

On November 10, 2020, Netflix renewed the series for a third season, which was released on June 22, 2022. While the series initially had a "TV-14" rating for its first two seasons, the maturity rating was increased to "TV-MA" for its third season, mainly due to an increase in profanity.

In June 2022, Blackman revealed that, should the series get renewed for a fourth season, it would most likely serve as the end to the series. Although he did not rule out the possibility of Netflix pursuing further installments. In August 2022, Netflix renewed the series for a fourth and final season, with Jesse McKeown serving as co-showrunner with Blackman. The season will also consist of six episodes, the shortest out of any season.

Writing 
In June 2022, it was revealed, according to series creator Steve Blackman, that the Season 3 scripts were complete when Elliot Page called him to share the news of his transition, with Blackman feeling it was "very important" that he and Page collaborate on incorporating Viktor's transition into the existing scripts. This led to Thomas Page McBee, who previously worked with Page on 2019's Tales of the City, being brought onboard to ensure that the storyline where Viktor comes out as trans was handled with care and respect.

Casting
On November 9, 2017, Netflix confirmed that Elliot Page had joined the cast and that he would play Vanya Hargreeves (now Viktor Hargreeves), also known as the White Violin. On November 30, 2017, it was revealed that Tom Hopper, David Castañeda, Emmy Raver-Lampman, Robert Sheehan and Aidan Gallagher had joined the cast as the rest of the Hargreeves siblings. On February 12, 2018, Netflix announced that Academy Award nominee Mary J. Blige would appear in the series as the sadistic time-travel assassin Cha-Cha. Colm Feore joined the cast as Sir Reginald Hargreeves, the adoptive father of the siblings, on February 16, 2018, alongside Cameron Britton, Adam Godley and Ashley Madekwe. On February 28, 2018, it was announced that John Magaro has been cast as a series regular character.

In January 2020, Justin H. Min and Kate Walsh were promoted to series regulars for the second season, following their recurring roles in the first season. On September 10, 2019, Netflix announced that three additional actors — Ritu Arya, Marin Ireland and Yusuf Gatewood — would join the cast. On October 17, 2019, John Kapelos announced that he would be joining the recurring cast as Jack Ruby, the man who killed Lee Harvey Oswald. On January 11, 2021, it was announced that Justin Cornwell, Britne Oldford, Genesis Rodriguez, Cazzie David, and Jake Epstein joined the cast as part of the Sparrow Academy for the third season. In January 2022, Javon Walton revealed in an interview he joined the cast in an undisclosed role for the third season.

In February 2023, Megan Mullally, Nick Offerman, and David Cross joined the cast for the fourth season in undisclosed capacities.

Filming
Principal photography for the first season began on January 15, 2018, in Toronto. Gerard Way's Instagram account shared an illustration by Fabio Moon of the cast and crew doing the first table read of the script in Toronto. Way also revealed a picture of the first day on the set. Additional filming took place in Hamilton, Ontario.

The theatre scene of Vanya performing was filmed at the Elgin Theatre and the Winter Garden Theatre. Mazzoleni Concert Hall was used to represent the theatre's exterior. The exterior of the mansion was filmed at a building in Hamilton, while the interiors were filmed in studio. The Joey & Toby Tanenbaum Opera Centre was filmed for an outside scene and LIUNA Station was used for a bank robbery scene. A laboratory at the University of Toronto was filmed to represent the Meritech Prosthetics building. The filming concluded on July 18, 2018.

Filming for the second season began on June 16, 2019. Like the previous season, it was filmed in Toronto and Hamilton, Ontario, despite the series taking place in Dallas, Texas. Exterior shots, including scenes in Dealey Plaza, were taken in Dallas. Filming concluded on November 23, 2019.

Filming for the third season began on February 7, 2021, and concluded on August 28, 2021.

Filming for the fourth season began on February 6, 2023.

Visual effects
Visual effects for the series are handled by SpinVFX, Weta Digital, Folks VFX, Soho VFX, Pixomondo, Deluxe VFX, Digital Film Tree, BOT VFX, Studio 8, Exceptional Minds and MARZ.

VFX supervisor Everet Burrell confirmed that he used traditional art techniques for early concept art and referenced great actors with iconic faces. Burrell called Weta Digital, who previously worked for the rebooted Planet of the Apes series, to develop the visual effects for the character of Pogo. Ken Hall provided the motion capture for Pogo using a gray suit to later make additions to his captures to create the CGI of the chimpanzee, with Adam Godley making the facial expressions and voice acting of the character.

SpinVFX confirmed that they delivered at least 563 shots for the series. To make the effects of the show, the team required a series of complex effect simulations, creature development, and massive destructions.

For the effects of Number Five jumping through time and space, Burrell wanted to make the effects look organic, and liquidy, representing how much time and the world bends around him when he jumps, and how quick it should be. For these effects, he used more than 30 frames in the first episodes, however with the progress of the series, this reduced to only 10 frames. To that footage, the team iterated on several kinds of spatial jump effects, all the way from heavy distortion to subtler images. The visual effects team started with some R&D tests. At the end, the final effect, called the "jelly vision", was used to make the series, with Burrell expressing: "as if you're pushing your hand through a jelly membrane, just for a few seconds, and then it pops. It's really, really subtle, but you get a little bit of texture, you get a little bit of striations, almost like the universe is bending as he does his spatial jumps."

In an interview with Burrell he confirmed that to develop the sequences where time is frozen, they took several background shots on location before returning to their stage to shoot the dialogue between Five and The Handler in front of a green screen. They called this effect "Three-Strip" in honor of the Technicolor process used in the 1930s.

The second season used 400 shots from the Folks VFX Montreal team under the guidance of VFX supervisor Laurent Spillemaecker to create time portal effects seen throughout the season, particularly Five's special ability. Meanwhile, Spillemaecker's crew recreated events surrounding JFK's fateful Dallas visit, while including The Umbrella Academy's superpower interactions. Pictures and references from the 1960s were provided to create and later to be used as digital matte paintings and CG environments, to transform Canada into the show's setting, 1960s Dallas.

The opening scene of the second season, where the siblings fight the Soviets on a Dallas street, was the most complicated to do, being nearly completely CGI. It was realised on a 360 degree bluescreen backlot set which was 15 feet tall and 200 feet by 60 feet. The only real things that were not made of CGI, were the tank, soldiers, cast and the rubble on the ground. The set was LiDAR scanned so that the director, Sylvian White could walk around using a VR edition of the iPad. They used a Phantom running at 700 frames per second on a camera stick. The scene was also divided in seven parts, beginning with Number Five's arrival at 1963, and concluding before Diego's first lines. For safety reasons the crew could not fire the AK-47s at Diego so they were forced to do multiple passes.

Music
The show's score albums were released for seasons 1 and 2. Jeff Russo was hired to compose the show's score. During an interview he revealed that the he "needed to use a subtle hand with the score" and that they "wanted the score to be thematic, by not trying to push too much on the weird and too much on the horrific aspect of the show and the story".

Reception

Audience viewership
On April 16, 2019, Netflix announced that the series had been streamed by over 45 million viewers on its service within its first month of release, with people at least having watched  70% percent of one episode of the series. It was the third most popular TV series on Netflix in 2019. On September 3, 2020, Netflix revealed the show broke numerous records in viewerships, following the second season debut. During the second season first week, the show was the most watched television series show on Netflix, being atop of the Nielsen ratings and thus confirming that 3 billion minutes of the show's two seasons were viewed. On October 21, 2020, Netflix published the Nielsen ratings and revealed that the show's second season was streamed by over 43 million viewers in its first 28 days. It made it the 6th most watched show of that year, falling behind shows like The Queen's Gambit and Ratched.

Critical reception

On the review aggregator Rotten Tomatoes, 76% of 93 critic reviews are positive for the first season, with an average rating of 7.2/10. Critics' consensus on the website reads, "The Umbrella Academy unfurls an imaginative yarn with furtive emotion and an exceptionally compelling ensemble, but the series' dour sensibility often clashes with its splashy genre trappings." Metacritic, which uses a weighted average, assigned the season a score of 61 out of 100 based on 22 critics, indicating "generally favorable reviews".

For the second season, Rotten Tomatoes identified 91% of 89 reviews as positive, with an average rating of 7.9/10. The website's critics consensus states, "Proof that time can heal almost all wounds, The Umbrella Academy exhilarating second season lightens its tonal load without losing its emotional core, giving the super siblings room to grow while doubling down on the time traveling fun." The season garnered a weighted average score of 67 out of 100 from 12 critics on Metacritic, signifying "generally favorable reviews".

For the third season, Rotten Tomatoes reports a 90% approval rating with an average rating of 7.6/10, based on 51 reviews. The website's critics consensus reads, "The Umbrella Academy unfurls a bit beyond a manageable scope in this overstuffed season, but there remains all the gonzo creativity and resonant character relationships that fans enroll for." Metacritic, which uses a weighted average, assigned a score of 74 out of 100 based on 10 critics, indicating "generally favorable reviews".

Accolades

See also

 Civil rights movement in popular culture
 Time Variance Authority, a Commission-like organization in appearing in Marvel comics

Notes

References

External links
 
 
 
 

The Umbrella Academy
2019 American television series debuts
2010s American drama television series
2010s American LGBT-related drama television series
2010s American science fiction television series
2010s American time travel television series
2020s American drama television series
2020s American LGBT-related drama television series
2020s American science fiction television series
2020s American time travel television series
Alternate history television series
American superhero television series
Apocalyptic television series
Civil rights movement in television
Cultural depictions of Jack Ruby
English-language Netflix original programming
LGBT-related superhero television shows
Nonlinear narrative television series
Fiction about resurrection
Serial drama television series
Superhero television series
Television series about dysfunctional families
Television series about ghosts
Television series by Universal Content Productions
Television series set in 1955
Television series set in 1963
Television series set in 1968
Television series set in 1982
Television series set in 1989
Television series set in 2019
Television shows about the assassination of John F. Kennedy
Television shows based on Dark Horse Comics
Television shows filmed in Hamilton, Ontario
Television shows filmed in Toronto
Television shows set in Dallas
Transgender-related television shows
Vietnam War in popular culture
Works about child abuse